All of the 4 Oregon incumbents were re-elected.

See also 
 List of United States representatives from Oregon
 United States House of Representatives elections, 1972

1972
Oregon
1972 Oregon elections